Tolisa is a place in north-eastern Bosnia and Herzegovina in region Bosanska Posavina. Tolisa has a population of approximately 3,900 people. Its name is derived from the Tolisa River.

History
The earliest records of Tolisa are from the 13th century: "Tera Tolis" (Latin: muded land.)

Tolisa is the home of the first civil elementary school in Bosnia and Herzegovina, founded in 1823 by parish priest friar Ilija Starčević.
The largest Catholic church in Bosnia and Herzegovina is located in Tolisa, constructed from 1864 to 1881.

Demographics 
According to the 2013 census, its population was 2,731.

References

Populated places in Orašje
Villages in the Federation of Bosnia and Herzegovina